Valerie Ahern is an American television screenwriter and producer.

She has written episodes for a number of television series since 1995 including The Young and the Restless (July 27, 2007 – November 29, 2007; April 4, 2008 – July 7, 2008), Clueless, Desperate Housewives, Corn & Peg, The Suite Life of Zack & Cody, Drawn Together, Brandy & Mr. Whiskers, The Parent 'Hood, Renovate My Family, Hot Properties, Spyder Games (head writer) and The Crew.

Ahern has served as executive story editor for many episodes of Clueless and story editor for Married... with Children. She has also produced an additional five episodes of Hot Properties. Her writing partner is Christian McLaughlin.

References

External links

KyleMcLachlan: Come Play Wiz Me
TheTrades
EntertainmentWeekly: The Summer Games – Spyder Games

American soap opera writers
American women screenwriters
Daytime Emmy Award winners
Year of birth missing (living people)
Living people
Soap opera producers
American television producers
American women television producers
American women television writers
Women soap opera writers
21st-century American women